Mexico–South Africa relations are the diplomatic relations between the United Mexican States and the Republic of South Africa. Both nations are members of the G-20 major economies, Group of 24 and the United Nations.

History 

Prior to World War II, diplomatic relations between Mexico and South Africa were practically non-existent. In the 1930s, Mexico opened an honorary consulate in Cape Town. Since the official implementation of Apartheid by the South African government, Mexico vehemently opposed South Africa's apartheid policy at the United Nations. Mexico also opposed South Africa's involvement and military interventions in Angola, Namibia and in Rhodesia (present-day Zimbabwe). In 1974, Mexico closed its honorary consulate in Cape Town and in 1976, Mexico ratified the International Convention on the Elimination of All Forms of Racial Discrimination which implied the commitment not to maintain economic, financial, commercial, sports and touristic relations with South Africa.

From 1980–1981, Mexico was non-permanent member in the United Nations Security Council. While on the council, Mexico voted in favor of United Nations Security Council Resolution 475 condemning the continuing attacks on Angola by South Africa through occupied South West Africa (present-day Namibia). In 1985, during a UN meeting for Namibia in Vienna, Mexico called for full-sanctions against the South African government. In 1968, South Africa was not invited to participate in the Summer Olympics held in Mexico City.

In 1991, Nelson Mandela, head of the African National Congress, visited Mexico thus paving the way for formal diplomatic relations to be established on 27 October 1993. In 1994, both nations established a diplomatic mission in each other's capital's, respectively.

In his 1997 book The Big Ten: The Big Emerging Markets and How They Will Change Our Lives (1997), Jeffrey Garten, Dean Emeritus at the Yale School of Management, identified both Mexico and South Africa as Big 10 economies. In 1999, Mexican Foreign Minister Rosario Green traveled to South Africa to attend the inauguration of President Thabo Mbeki. In 2002, President Mbeki paid a visit to Mexico to attend the Monterrey Consensus and met with Mexican President Vicente Fox. That same year, President Fox paid a visit to South Africa. In June 2010, Mexican President Felipe Calderón paid a visit to South Africa to attend the 2010 FIFA World Cup and met with South African President Jacob Zuma. In November 2010, President Zuma paid a visit to Mexico to attend the 2010 United Nations Climate Change Conference in Cancún. In December 2013, Mexican President Enrique Peña Nieto visited South Africa to attend the funeral for Nelson Mandela.

In 2019, Mexican Foreign Undersecretary, Julián Ventura Valero, paid a visit to South Africa to celebrate 25 years of diplomatic relations between both nations.

High-level visits

High-level visits from Mexico to South Africa

 Foreign Undersecretary Carmen Moreno Toscano (1998)
 Foreign Minister Rosario Green (1999)
 President Vicente Fox (2002)
 Foreign Minister Patricia Espinosa (2009)
 President Felipe Calderón (2010) 
 President Enrique Peña Nieto (2013)
 Foreign Minister José Antonio Meade (2017)
 Foreign Undersecretary Julián Ventura Valero (2019)

High-level visits from South Africa to Mexico

 President Thabo Mbeki (2002)
 Deputy President Phumzile Mlambo-Ngcuka (2008)
 President Jacob Zuma (2010, 2012)
 Foreign Minister Maite Nkoana-Mashabane (2010)
 Vice President Cyril Ramaphosa (2015)

Bilateral agreements 
Both nations have signed several bilateral agreements such as a General Cooperation Agreement (1998); Agreement on Cultural Cooperation (2004); Technical Cooperation Agreement on Social Development (2006); Memorandum of Understanding between the Chapingo Autonomous University and the University of the Free State (2006); Cooperation Agreement on Species Conservation between the Chapultepec Zoo and the Pretoria Zoo (2007); Memorandum of Understanding for the Establishment of a Mexico-South Africa Bi-national Commission (2009); Agreement for the Avoidance of Double Taxation and Prevention of Fiscal Evasion (2009); Mexico-South Africa Joint Declaration: Towards a Priority Relationship (2010); Agreement on Scientific and Technological Cooperation (2010); Memorandum of Understanding for the Establishment of a Mechanism of Consultation in Matters of Mutual Interest (2011); Extradition Treaty (2014); Memorandum of Understanding between ProMéxico and Trade and Investment South Africa (2014); Agreement on Cooperation in Tourism (2014) and an Agreement of Cooperation between Mexico's National Autonomous University of Mexico and South Africa's University of the Witwatersrand for the creation of a Centre for Mexican Studies at the University of Witwatersrand (2017).

Trade relations 

In 2018, trade between the two nations amounted to US$649 million. Mexico's main exports to South Africa include: machinery equipment, automobiles, photography equipment, and medicine. South Africa's main exports to Mexico include: minerals, iron based products, aeronautical equipment and automobiles. Mexican multinational companies such as Azteca Mexican Food Products, Grupo Bimbo, Gruma and KidZania operate in South Africa.

Resident diplomatic missions 
 Mexico has an embassy in Pretoria.
 South Africa has an embassy in Mexico City.

See also
 Hacienda Humboldt

References 

 
South Africa
Bilateral relations of South Africa